Araneus bicentenarius, the giant lichen orbweaver, is a species of orb weaver in the family Araneidae. It is found in the USA and Canada.

Range
The giant lichen orb weaver occurs in the Eastern part of the United States and in Southeastern Canada.

Web
Like most other orb weaver species, Araneus bicentenarius spins large webs up to 8 feet in diameter. While most other species of its genera usually wait for prey upside down in the center of the web, the giant lichen orb weaver spends most time at the edge of the web.

References

 Bradley, Richard A. (2012). Common Spiders of North America. University of California Press.
 Ubick, Darrell (2005). Spiders of North America: An Identification Manual. American Arachnological Society.

Araneus
Spiders described in 1888